The Beach at Expedia Group, or simply The Beach, is a 2.6-acre beach on the Expedia Group campus in Seattle, Washington, United States.

References

Parks in Seattle